Oldridge is a surname. Notable people with the surname include:

Barry Oldridge (born 1950), New Zealand wrestler
Bob Oldridge (born 1957), British footballer

References

English-language surnames